The 2012 Gerry Weber Open was a men's tennis tournament played on outdoor grass courts. It was the 20th edition of the event known that year as the Gerry Weber Open and is part of the ATP World Tour 250 series of the 2012 ATP World Tour. It took place at the Gerry Weber Stadion in Halle, Germany, between 11 and 17 June 2012. Unseeded Tommy Haas won the singles title.

Singles main draw entrants

Seeds
 
 1 Seedings are based on the rankings of May 28, 2012

Other entrants
The following players received wildcards into the singles main draw:
   Dustin Brown
  Tommy Haas 
  Philipp Petzschner

The following players received entry from the qualifying draw:
  Konstantin Kravchuk
  Tim Smyczek 
  Zhang Ze
  Mischa Zverev

Withdrawals
  Gaël Monfils (right knee injury)
  Kei Nishikori (stomach injury)

Doubles main draw entrants

Seeds

 Rankings are as of May 28, 2012

Other entrants
The following pairs received wildcards into the doubles main draw:
  Marco Chiudinelli /  Mischa Zverev
  Tommy Haas /  Alexander Waske

Retirements
  Marcel Granollers (right ankle strain)

Finals

Singles

 Tommy Haas defeated  Roger Federer, 7–6(7–5), 6–4

Doubles

 Aisam-ul-Haq Qureshi /  Jean-Julien Rojer defeated  Treat Conrad Huey /  Scott Lipsky, 6–3, 6–4

References

External links
 Official website in English